Sofiivka is an urban-type settlement in the Kramatorsk Raion of Donetsk Oblast in eastern Ukraine. The village's population was 912 as of the 2001 Ukrainian census. Current population: 

Sofiivka was designated as an urban-type settlement in 1962. The settlement belongs to the Shabelkivka Settlement Council, as part of the local government scheme in Ukraine.

The results of the 2001 census demonstrated that 61.95 percent of Sofiivka's population chose Ukrainian as their native language, compared to 38.05% for the Russian language.

References

Urban-type settlements in Kramatorsk Raion